Lavender is an unincorporated community in Kittitas County, in the U.S. state of Washington.

The origin of name Lavender is unknown.

The name Lavender comes from the semi permanent hunting camp established for John Lavender who was an early Washington resident from Lavendertown, next door to Selleck, Washington.

References

Unincorporated communities in Kittitas County, Washington
Unincorporated communities in Washington (state)